Nirmala Matha Convent Higher Secondary School (formerly Nirmala Matha Convent Matriculation Higher Secondary School) is a higher secondary school in Kuniyamuthur and Vellalore , in Coimbatore, Tamil Nadu, India. It was founded in 1993 by Sisters of the Adoration of the Blessed Sacrament [S.A.B.S.].
 The school follows state board syllabus.

See also
 St Joseph's Matriculation Higher Secondary School
 Avila Convent
 Carmel Garden Matriculation Higher Secondary School
 Lisieux Matriculation Higher Secondary School

References

External links
  Official website

Catholic secondary schools in India
Christian schools in Tamil Nadu
High schools and secondary schools in Tamil Nadu
Schools in Coimbatore
Educational institutions established in 1993
1993 establishments in Tamil Nadu